The Human Body is an eight-part documentary series, first shown on 20 May 1998 on BBC One and presented by medical scientist Robert Winston. A co-production between the BBC and The Learning Channel, the series looks at the mechanics and emotions of the human body from birth to death.

The series was nominated for numerous awards, winning several, including three BAFTA awards, four RTS awards and a Peabody Award.

Production
Described as the BBC's "first major TV series on human biology", it took over two years to make and aimed to be the definitive set of programmes on the human body. The series was produced by Richard Dale and presented by Professor Robert Winston, a fertility expert.

The series used a variety of different techniques to present the topics being discussed, including endoscopes and computer graphics for internal shots, time-lapse photography to show the growth of hair and nails, magnetic resonance imaging and scanning electron microscopy.

Episodes
 "Life Story" – Every second, a world of miraculous microscopic events take place within the body. (20 May 1998)
 "An Everyday Miracle" – The drama of conception activates the most sophisticated life support machine on earth. (27 May 1998)
 "First Steps" – In four years, the new-born child learns every survival skill. (3 June 1998)
 "Raging Teens" – The hormone-driven roller-coaster otherwise known as adolescence! (10 June 1998)
 "Brain Power" – The adult human brain is the most complicated - and mysterious - object in the universe. In this episode, Winston deliberately intoxicates himself in a restaurant to show the effects alcohol has on the brain. (17 June 1998)
 "The Making of the Human Body" – Winston reveals the secrets behind his human biology series (21 June 1998)
 "As Time Goes By" – Ageing is far more complex - and fascinating - than mere decline. (24 June 1998)
 "The End of Life" – Even in death, the body reveals remarkable secrets. (25 June 1998)

Reception
The series gained 6.3 million viewers and an audience share of 38%.

Awards
The series was nominated for numerous awards, winning several, including three BAFTA awards, four RTS awards and a Peabody Award.

Other formats
A DVD of the series was released in July 2001 and includes a 50-minute feature on The Making of the Human Body - A final overview that reveals the techniques and developments that made the series possible.

The series was adapted into a film released for IMAX cinemas, with Robert Winston returning to narrate. The film won the Giant Screen Theatre Association's Best Film For Lifelong Learning award.

Book
The book accompanying the series was written by Anthony Smith. According to one review, "Smith transcends anatomical trivia to record our bodies' powerful tale with empathy and clarity."

References

External links
 
 The Human Body special report. BBC News.
 
 

BBC television documentaries about science
Human body
Peabody Award-winning television programs
BAFTA winners (television series)
1998 British television series debuts
1998 British television series endings
1990s British documentary television series
English-language television shows
TLC (TV network) original programming